In 1888 the directors of the Holyhood Cemetery Association purchased land in West Roxbury to develop St. Joseph Cemetery.

In 1950, the Directors of Holyhood 1950 opened a new section on VFW Parkway called St. James the Apostle. Extensive landscape improvements have been carried out over the last ten years, and the main cemetery is almost fully developed.

The cemetery contains two British Commonwealth war graves of a Canadian Army Private from each of the two World Wars.

Notable burials
 Whitey Bulger (1929–2018), American organized crime boss, gangster, and FBI informant
 Jeremiah E. Burke (1867–1931), superintendent of Boston Public Schools
 John F. Collins (1919–1995), Massachusetts State Representative (1947–51), Massachusetts State Senator (1951–55), Mayor of Boston (1960–68)
 Mary Collins (1920–2010), first lady of Boston (1960–68)
 Paul A. Dever (1903–1958), Governor of Massachusetts and Massachusetts Attorney General
 John Joseph Douglass (1873–1939), Massachusetts State Representative (1899, 1900, 1906, and 1913), member of the United States House of Representatives from Massachusetts (1925–35)
 Arthur Fiedler (1894–1979), American conductor known for his association with both the Boston Symphony and Boston Pops orchestras
 John Francis "Honey Fitz" Fitzgerald (1863–1950), member of the United States House of Representatives from Massachusetts (1895–1901), Mayor of Boston (1906–08), grandfather and namesake of U.S. President John F. Kennedy
 Louise Day Hicks (1916–2003), member of the United States House of Representatives from Massachusetts (1971–73), President of the Boston City Council (1976)
 John Patrick Higgins (1893–1955), Massachusetts State Representative (1929–34), member of the United States House of Representatives from Massachusetts (1935–37)
 John Bernard Hynes (1897–1970), Mayor of Boston (1950–60), President of the United States Conference of Mayors (1955–57)
 Gregory Eric “Greg” Kelley (1944–1961), American figure skater
 John Joseph “Jack” Kirrane Jr. (1928–2016), American ice hockey player
 John William McCormack (1891–1980), Massachusetts State Representative (1920–22), Massachusetts State Senator (1923–28), member of the United States House of Representatives from Massachusetts (1928–71), Speaker of the United States House of Representatives (1962–71)
 William Sarsfield McNary (1863–1930), Massachusetts State Senator (1889–90, 1891–92), Chairperson of the Massachusetts Democratic Party (1901–04), Massachusetts State Representative (1900–02), member of the United States House of Representatives from Massachusetts (1903–07)
 Joseph Francis O'Connell (1872–1942), member of the United States House of Representatives from Massachusetts (1907–11)
 H. James Shea Jr. (1939–1970), Massachusetts State Representative (1969–70) and anti-war activist
 William Joseph Stewart (1895–1964), American coach and sports official who was a referee in the National Hockey League (NHL) and an umpire in Major League Baseball (MLB), inductee of the United States Hockey Hall of Fame
 William Sweeney (1886–1948), infielder in Major League Baseball (1907–14)
 Kevin Hagan White (1929–2012), Massachusetts Secretary of the Commonwealth (1961–67), Mayor of Boston (1968–84)

See also
 List of cemeteries in Boston, Massachusetts

References

External links 
 The Holyhood Cemetery Association
 

Cemeteries in Boston
Roman Catholic cemeteries in Massachusetts
1888 establishments in Massachusetts
Cemeteries established in the 1880s